Vajuga is a village in Serbia in the municipality of Kladovo, in the district of Bor. In 2002, it had 563 inhabitants, of which the majority were Serbs.

A necropolis with burials, ceramics and metal items dating to 8th century BC was unearthed at the Vajuga locality.

Demographics

Evolution of the population
 1948 : 870
 1953 : 929
 1961 : 931
 1971 : 
 1981 : 952
 1991 : 843
 2002 : 563.

Population statistics(2002)
 Serbs : 355 (63,05%)
 Romanians : 11 (1,95%)
 Yugoslavs : 3 (0,53%)
 Vlachs : 2 (0,35%)
 Unknown/Others.

See also 

 List of cities, towns and villages in Serbia (A-M)
 List of cities in Serbia

External links
  Satellite view of Vajuga
  Vajuga

Notes and references 

Populated places in Bor District